Three is the third album by jazz musician Bob James.

Reception

Released in 1976, the album charted at number two on the Jazz Album Charts.

Track listing
"One Mint Julep" (Rudy Toombs) – 9:09
"Women of Ireland" (Seán Ó Riada) – 8:07
"Westchester Lady" (Bob James) – 7:29
"Storm King" (Bob James) – 6:37
"Jamaica Farewell" (Lord Burgess) – 5:24
"Look Look" (Bob James) – 4:48 *

* Japanese bonus track only.

Personnel 
 Bob James – keyboards, arrangements and conductor 
 Jeff Mironov – guitar (1)
 Eric Gale – guitar solo (2), guitar (3, 4, 5)
 Hugh McCracken – guitar (2-5)
 Gary King – bass guitar (1, 2, 5)
 Will Lee – bass guitar (3, 4)
 Andy Newmark – drums (1)
 Harvey Mason – drums (2-5)
 Ralph MacDonald – percussion

Brass and Woodwinds
 Eddie Daniels – alto saxophone, tenor saxophone, flute
 Grover Washington Jr. – soprano saxophone, tenor saxophone, tin whistle
 Jerry Dodgion – flute
 Hubert Laws – flute
 Wayne Andre – trombone
 Dave Bargeron – bass trombone, tuba
 Dave Taylor – bass trombone
 Jon Faddis – trumpet
 John Frosk – trumpet
 Lew Soloff – trumpet
 Marvin Stamm – trumpet

Strings
 Charles McCracken – cello
 Alan Shulman – cello
 Gloria Agostini – harp
 Al Brown – viola
 Emanuel Vardi – viola
 Frederick Buldrini – violin
 Harry Cykman – violin
 Lewis Eley – violin
 Max Ellen – violin
 Emanuel Green – violin
 Harold Kohon – violin
 David Nadien – violin
 Matthew Raimondi – violin

Production 
 Creed Taylor – producer 
 Rudy Van Gelder – engineer
 Rene Schumacher – album design 
 Richard Alcorn – photography

Charts

References 

1976 albums
Bob James (musician) albums
CTI Records albums
Albums produced by Creed Taylor
Albums recorded at Van Gelder Studio